The Gameroom Tele-Pong (sometimes also called Entex Gameroom Tele-Pong or ENTEX Gameroom Tele-Pong) is a dedicated first-generation home video game console developed, published and marketed by Entex Industries starting in 1976. The Gameroom Tele-Pong displays the games in black and white. The score is built in the console. It has no sound. The Gameroom Tele-Pong is similar to the first Japanese video game console, Epoch's TV Tennis Electrotennis, released a year prior.

There was also a version released in the United Kingdom marketed by Binatone called the TV Game Unit. It had a price of £23.95.

References

External links
  (Feb 18, 2015. By Sly DC.)
Gameroom Tele-Pong at www.old-computers.com

1976 in video gaming
Video game consoles